SPHS may stand for one of the following high schools:

In the United States:
 St. Patrick's High School (Maysville, Kentucky), a private Catholic high school in Maysville, Kentucky
 St. Patrick High School (North Platte, Nebraska), a private Catholic high school in North Platte, Nebraska
 St. Patrick High School (Portland, Michigan), a private Catholic high school in Portland, Michigan
 St. Paul High School (Ohio), a private Catholic high school in Norwalk, Ohio
 St. Peter High School, a public school in St. Peter, Minnesota
 St. Petersburg High School, a public school in St. Petersburg, Florida
 San Pasqual High School (Escondido, California), a public high school in Escondido, California
 San Pasqual High School (Winterhaven, California), a public high school in Winterhaven, California
 San Pedro High School, a public high school in San Pedro, Los Angeles, California
 Science Park High School (New Jersey), a public high school in Newark, New Jersey
 Severna Park High School, a public high school in Severna Park, Maryland
 Sierra Pacific High School, a public high school in Hanford, California
 South Pasadena High School, a public high school in South Pasadena, California
 South Plainfield High School, a public high school in South Plainfield, New Jersey
 South Plantation High School, a public high school in Plantation, Florida
 South Plaquemines High School, a public high school in Buras, Louisiana
 South Pointe High School (Phoenix, Arizona), a public high school in Phoenix, Arizona
 South Pointe High School (Rock Hill, South Carolina), a public high school in Rock Hill, South Carolina
 Sparrows Point High School, a public school in Baltimore county, Maryland
 Special Projects High School, now known as University High School (Tucson), an accelerated public high school in Tucson, Arizona
 Stony Point High School, a public school in Round Rock, Texas
 Sun Prairie High School, a high school in Sun Prairie, Wisconsin
Suncoast Polytechnical High School
Sunset Park High School

In other countries:
 Sandy Point High School, a public high school in Saint Kitts and Nevis
 South Point High School, a privately owned elite school in Kolkata, West Bengal, India

See also 
 St. Patrick's High School (disambiguation)
 St. Paul High School (disambiguation)